Tsering Yangzom Lama is a Tibetan writer based in Vancouver, British Columbia, whose debut novel We Measure the Earth with Our Bodies was published in 2022.

She was born and raised in a Tibetan refugee community in Nepal before immigrating to Canada and then the United States.

Lama received a bachelor of arts in creative writing and international relations from the University of British Columbia ,and an MFA in writing from Columbia University. She has been a resident at the Banff Centre for Arts and Creativity, the Virginia Center for the Creative Arts, and the Vermont Studio Center. She was a 2018 Tin House Scholar.

We Measure the Earth with Our Bodies, inspired in part by her own experiences, tells the story of two Tibetan refugee sisters who settle in Canada. The novel was shortlisted for the 2022 Giller Prize, and longlisted for the inaugural Carol Shields Prize for Fiction in 2023.

References 

21st-century Canadian novelists
21st-century Canadian women writers
Canadian women novelists
Canadian writers of Asian descent
Canadian people of Tibetan descent
Living people
Columbia University School of the Arts alumni
University of British Columbia alumni
Writers from Vancouver
Year of birth missing (living people)